Havana 3am is the eponymous debut album by the rock supergroup Havana 3am.  The woman shown on the cover was bassist Paul Simonon's girlfriend at that time.

Track listing
All tracks composed by Nigel Dixon, Gary Myrick and Paul Simonon.
"Joyride"
"Blue Motorcycle Eyes"
"Reach the Rock"
"Death in the Afternoon"
"Hole in the Sky"
"What About Your Future"
"The Hardest Game"
"Hey Amigo"
"Life on the Line"
"Surf in the City"
"Blue Gene Vincent"
"Living in This Town"

Personnel
Havana 3am
 Nigel Dixon - lead vocals, rhythm guitar
 Gary Myrick - lead guitar, acoustic guitar, backing vocals
 Paul Simonon - bass guitar, backing vocals, harmonica
 Travis Williams - drums, percussion
with:
 Derek Holt - harpsichord
 Gus Andrews - Mexican horns
Technical
Masahiko Yamazaki - engineer
Geoff Perrin - mixing engineer
Mike Laye - cover photograph

References

1991 debut albums
Havana 3am albums
Capitol Records albums